Rusenii may refer to several places in Romania:

 Rusenii Noi, a village in Holboca Commune, Iaşi County
 Rusenii Răzeşti and Rusenii de Sus, villages in Plopana Commune, Bacău County